List of Astro Boy episodes may refer to:

List of Astro Boy (1963) episodes
List of Astro Boy (1980) episodes
List of Astro Boy (2003) episodes